Brussels-Meulebeke was a men's road cycling road race held in Belgium annually in May from 1964 to 1975. The competition's roll of honor includes two victories by Rik Van Looy and Eddy Merckx. The record of victories, however, belongs to Freddy Maertens. The race has always been won by Belgian riders.

The last part of this race was cycled behind Dernys.

Winners

References 

Cycle races in Belgium
1964 establishments in Belgium
Defunct cycling races in Belgium
Recurring sporting events established in 1964
Recurring sporting events disestablished in 1975